Ajit Bharihoke is a former judge of the Delhi High Court. He is known for presiding over several high-profile cases such as Bofors Scandal, Jharkhand Mukti Morcha bribery case, St Kitts case, Lakhubhai Pathak case, Urea Scam.

Early life, education and career 
He earned an LLB degree from Punjab University, Chandigarh and subsequently joined Delhi Judicial Service on 7 December 1974. He served in many judicial positions such as Additional District and Sessions Judge, Special Judge Anti Corruption (CBI), etc. He became Registrar General, Delhi High Court from 6 January 2007 to 13 May 2009.

He was appointed as an Additional Judge in Delhi High Court on 14 May 2009 and retired from the post on 16 October 2011.

Prominent judgements 

In Jharkhand Mukti Morcha bribery case, he sentenced former Prime Minister PV Narasimha Rao and former Home Minister Buta Singh to three years’ rigorous imprisonment. This was the first case of a Prime Minister to be convicted in a criminal case.

References 

Living people
Judges of the Delhi High Court
20th-century Indian judges
Panjab University alumni
Year of birth missing (living people)